In mathematics, a point  is called an isolated point of a subset  (in a topological space ) if  is an element of  and there exists a neighborhood of  that does not contain any other points of . This is equivalent to saying that the singleton  is an open set in the topological space  (considered as a subspace of ).

Related notions 
A set that is made up only of isolated points is called a discrete set (see also discrete space). Any discrete subset  of Euclidean space must be countable, since the isolation of each of its points together with the fact that rationals are dense in the reals means that the points of  may be mapped injectively onto a set of points with rational coordinates, of which there are only countably many.  However, not every countable set is discrete, of which the rational numbers under the usual Euclidean metric are the canonical example. 

A set with no isolated point is said to be dense-in-itself (every neighbourhood of a point contains  other points of the set).  A closed set with no isolated point is called a perfect set (it contains all its limit points and no isolated points).

The number of isolated points is a topological invariant, i.e. if two topological spaces  are homeomorphic, the number of isolated points in each is equal.

Examples

Standard examples

Topological spaces in the following three examples are considered as subspaces of the real line with the standard topology.

 For the set  the point 0 is an isolated point.
 The set  of natural numbers is a discrete set.
Such a situation is not possible in a Hausdorff space.

The Morse lemma states that non-degenerate critical points of certain functions are isolated.

Two counter-intuitive examples
Consider the set  of points  in the real interval  such that every digit  of their binary representation fulfills the following conditions: 
 Either  or 
  only for finitely many indices .
 If  denotes the largest index such that  then 
 If  and  then exactly one of the following two conditions holds:  or 
Informally, these conditions means that every digit of the binary representation of  that equals 1 belongs to a pair ...0110..., except for ...010... at the very end.

Now,  is an explicit set consisting entirely of isolated points but has the counter-intuitive property that its closure is an uncountable set.

Another set  with the same properties can be obtained as follows.

See also
Acnode
Adherent point
Accumulation point
Point cloud

References

External links
 

General topology